= P53-responsive gene 1 =

Non-coding RNA in the species Homo sapiens

PRG1

Identifiers
- Aliases: p53-responsive gene 1
- External IDs: OMIM: 605157; GeneCards: ; OMA:- orthologs
Orthologs
Species	Human	Mouse
Entrez	23574	n/a
Ensembl	n/a	n/a
UniProt	n a	n/a
RefSeq (mRNA)	n/a	n/a
RefSeq (protein)	n/a	n/a
Location (UCSC)	n/a	n/a
PubMed search		n/a
- Wikidata
View/Edit Human

P53-responsive gene 1 is a protein that in humans is encoded by the PRG1 gene.
